Craig Pearce is an Australian screenwriter and actor.

Pearce's acting credits include a regular role in soap opera The Restless Years in 1981, guest roles in Bellamy, E Street and G.P., and film roles in I Can't Get Started (1985), Nightmaster (1988), To Make a Killing (1988), Mad Bomber in Love (1992) and The Seventh Floor (1994).

Pearce co-wrote the play Strictly Ballroom and the screenplay of the 1992 movie adaptation with Baz Luhrmann. Pearce created Will which aired on TNT. He co-wrote the screenplay for the 1996 film Romeo + Juliet, the 2001 film Moulin Rouge!, the 2013 film The Great Gatsby, and the 2022 film Elvis; all with Luhrmann. He created and wrote all six episodes of the 2022 series Pistol, based on Steve Jones's autobiography.

He received the Australian Writers' Guild Lifetime Achievement Award in 2016.

Personal life
Pearce was educated at Narrabeen Sports High School with Baz Luhrmann and is a graduate of National Institute of Dramatic Art (NIDA). He was previously married to Strictly Ballroom actor Tara Morice with whom he has a daughter. He married his second wife Emma in 2012. Which later resulted in a Divorce. Craig is now in a relationship with a young woman named Lucille.

References

External links
 

Australian screenwriters
Australian male film actors
Best Adapted Screenplay BAFTA Award winners
Living people
Year of birth missing (living people)
Place of birth missing (living people)